Herman Frans Anna baron Van der Wee (born 10 July 1928) is a Belgian economic historian. He was a full professor of social and economic history at the KU Leuven from 1969 to 1993. The academic output of Van der Wee spans economic history, the history of banking, financial history. He has performed research on the period from the Middle Ages to the present time. Geographically he has performed broad research as well, looking into Antwerp, Belgium, the Low Countries, Europe and the world.

Career
Van der Wee was born on 10 July 1928 in Lier to Jos Van der Wee and Martha Planckaert. He started studying law at the Catholic University of Leuven in 1945. In 1949 he obtained a degree in philosophy. In 1950 he obtained his doctorate in law. Van der Wee obtained a further degree in social and political studies in 1951. In 1963 he obtained his doctorate in history with a thesis titled: "The Growth of the Antwerp Market and the European Economy, fourteenth-sixteenth centuries."

In 1955 Van der Wee became a lecturer at the Catholic University of Leuven. From 1956 to 1963 Van der Wee worked for the factory of his father-in-law. Which allowed him to develop further insight into the practicalities of economic life. During this period the later politician Frank Vandenbroucke worked for two years as his assistant. In 1966 he became associate professor at the Catholic University of Leuven and the next year he obtained a position as professor. By 1969 he was named full professor social and economic history at the KU Leuven. Van der Wee was first employed primarily by the Faculty of Economics, but in 1977 this was expanded to include the Faculty of History. Van der Wee took up emeritus status in 1993. At the university, a fund was set up in his name to support the internationalization of multidisciplinary research projects. Van der Wee was President of the International Economic History Association between 1986 and 1990.

The academic interest of Van der Wee spans the period from the Middle Ages to the present time. Geographically he has studied Antwerp, Belgium, the Low Countries, Europe and the world. He has performed research in the areas of economic history, the history of banking, financial history.

Honours and awards
Van der Wee was elected a member of the Royal Flemish Academy of Belgium for Science and the Arts in 1977. He was elected a foreign member of the Royal Netherlands Academy of Arts and Sciences in 1984. He was elected Corresponding Fellow of the British Academy in 1987. Van der Wee was one of the founding members of the Academia Europaea in 1988. In 1993 he was elected international honorary member of the American Academy of Arts and Sciences. In 1995 he became a Corresponding Fellow of the Royal Historical Society.

In 1992 Van der Wee won the Dr A. H. Heineken Prize for History, awarded by the Royal Netherlands Academy of Arts and Sciences, for his work in economic history. In 1994 he was knighted by King Albert II of Belgium with the title of baron. Van der Wee was recipient of the 1995 Golden Medal of Honor of the Flemish Parliament. He received an honorary degree from the University of Leicester in 1995.

Personal life
Van der Wee married fellow history student Monique Verbreyt in 1954. Van der Wee has two children. His daughter Barbara is an architect. The house was built for Van der Wee in 1963.

References

External links
Profile at KU Leuven

1928 births
Living people
Barons of Belgium
20th-century Belgian historians
Catholic University of Leuven (1834–1968) alumni
Academic staff of the Catholic University of Leuven (1834–1968)
Corresponding Fellows of the British Academy
Economic historians
Fellows of the American Academy of Arts and Sciences
Fellows of the Royal Historical Society
Academic staff of KU Leuven
Members of Academia Europaea
Members of the Royal Flemish Academy of Belgium for Science and the Arts
Members of the Royal Netherlands Academy of Arts and Sciences
People from Lier, Belgium
Winners of the Heineken Prize